This is a list of episodes of the children's television series The Magic School Bus, which is based on the series of books of the same name written by Joanna Cole and Bruce Degen.

The show's continuity is not necessarily dependent on the order in which the episodes aired. In the first episode aired ("Gets Lost In Space"), Arnold mentions that the class has already been inside a rotten log ("Meets the Rot Squad") and to the bottom of the ocean (various episodes, including "Gets Eaten", "Blows Its Top", and "Ups and Downs").

Series overview

Episodes

Season 1 (1994)

Season 2 (1995)
Danny Tamberelli replaces Amos Crawley as Arnold.
Andre Ottley Lorant replaces Max Beckford as Tim.

Season 3 (1996)

Season 4 (1997)

Home media

Videocassettes
These videocassettes were released by KidVision and later Warner Home Video.
 Gets Lost in Space (February 1, 1995)
 For Lunch (February 1, 1995)
 Inside Ralphie (June 13, 1995)
 Gets Eaten (June 13, 1995)
 Hops Home (June 13, 1995)
 Inside the Haunted House (September 12, 1995)
 Plays Ball (February 13, 1996)
 Goes to Seed (February 13, 1996)
 Kicks Up a Storm (February 13, 1996)
 Blows Its Top (October 1, 1996)
 Going Batty (October 1, 1996)
 The Busasaurus (April 15, 1997)
 Taking Flight (April 15, 1997)
 Flexes Its Muscles (April 15, 1997)
 Gets Ready, Set, Dough (July 29, 1997)
 Gets Ants in Its Pants (July 29, 1997)
 Getting Energized (February 17, 1998)
 Out of this World (February 17, 1998)
 Butterflies! (April 20, 1999)
 In a Beehive (July 27, 1999)
 Spins a Web (July 27, 1999)
 Under Construction (April 25, 2000)
 In the Rainforest (April 25, 2000)
 Creepy Crawly Fun (August 8, 2000)
 In a Pickle (August 8, 2000)
 Gets Planted (July 3, 2001)
 Makes a Rainbow (July 3, 2001)
 Holiday Special (October 8, 2002)

DVDs
Each DVD contains three episodes of the series. The following is a list of episodes appearing on each DVD. All of the DVDs are for Region 1. DVDs were released by Warner from 2002 to 2005, and by Scholastic in 2006. Current releases are issued through Cinedigm.

 The Magic School Bus – Bugs, Bugs, Bugs (September 28, 2004, reissued July 31, 2012)
 Gets Ants in Its Pants
 In a Beehive
 Butterfly and the Bog Beast
 Gains Weight (bonus episode on Cinedigm issue)
 The Magic School Bus – Space Adventures (January 28, 2003, reissued July 31, 2012)
 Gets Lost in Space
 Out of This World
 Taking Flight (only on Warner issue)
 Gains Weight (only on Cinedigm issue)
 Plays Ball (bonus episode on Cinedigm issue)
 Space Explorers (book included with some copies of Cinedigm issue)
 The Magic School Bus – Human Body (September 6, 2005, reissued July 31, 2012)
 For Lunch
 Inside Ralphie
 Flexes Its Muscles
 Gets Planted (bonus episode on Cinedigm issue)
 The Search for the Missing Bones (book included with some copies of Cinedigm issue)
 The Magic School Bus: Catches a Wave (September 6, 2005, reissued July 31, 2012)
 Wet All Over
 Ups and Downs
 Rocks and Rolls
 Goes Upstream (bonus episode on Cinedigm issue)
 The Magic School Bus – Super Sports Fun (September 28, 2004, reissued July 31, 2012)
 Plays Ball
 Works Out
 Shows and Tells
 Rocks and Rolls (bonus episode on Cinedigm issue)
 The Magic School Bus – Creepy, Crawly Fun! (August 20, 2002, reissued August 7, 2012)
 In the Haunted House
 Going Batty
 Spins a Web
 Flexes Its Muscles (bonus episode on Cinedigm issue)
 The Magic School Bus – Holiday Special (October 8, 2002, reissued November 13, 2012)
 Holiday Special
 In the Arctic (only on Cinedigm issue)
 In the Rainforest
 All Dried Up (only on Warner issue)
 Gets Charged (bonus episode on Cinedigm issue)
 The Magic School Bus – Takes a Dive (9/26/2006)
 Takes a Dive
 Gets Swamped
 Goes to Mussel Beach
 For Lunch (bonus episode on Cinedigm issue)
 The Great Shark Escape (book included with some copies of Cinedigm issue)
 The Magic School Bus – Sees Stars (9/26/2006)
 Sees Stars
 Gains Weight
 Goes on Air
 The Magic School Bus – The Busasaurus (7/31/2012)
 The Busasaurus
 Cold Feet
 Goes Upstream
 Gets Eaten (bonus episode)
 The Magic School Bus – The Food Chain (7/31/2012)
 Gets Eaten
 Meets the Rot Squad
 Gets Ready, Set, Dough
 Butterfly and the Bog Beast (bonus episode)
 The Magic School Bus – Takes Flight (7/31/2012)
 Kicks Up a Storm
 Taking Flight
 Hops Home
 Gets Swamped (bonus episode)
 The Magic School Bus – The Complete Series (9/25/2012)
 The Magic School Bus – All About Earth (10/1/2013)
 Goes to Seed
 Blows Its Top
 Goes on Air
 All Dried Up (bonus episode)
 The Magic School Bus – Cracks a Yolk (1/28/2014)
 In the City
 Cracks a Yolk
 All Dried Up
 Gets Ants in Its Pants (bonus episode)
 The Magic School Bus – Getting Energized (1/28/2014)
 Getting Energized
 Gets Charged
 Gets a Bright Idea
 In the Haunted House (bonus episode)
 The Magic School Bus – In a Pickle (1/28/2014)
 In a Pickle
 Meets Molly Cule
 Makes a Stink
 Meets the Rot Squad (bonus episode)
 The Magic School Bus – Super Star Power (7/31/2012)
 Gets Planted
 Goes Cellular
 Sees Stars
 Taking Flight (bonus episode)
 The Magic School Bus – Under Construction (9/9/2014)
 Under Construction
 Revving Up
 Gets Programmed
 Hops Home (bonus episode)

Notes

The Magic School Bus
Magic School Bus, The
Magic School Bus, The